The Journal of Transportation Engineering, Part B: Pavements is a peer-reviewed scientific journal published by the American Society of Civil Engineers. It covers planning, design, construction, operation, and maintenance of airport, roadway and other pavement systems. Papers that cover pavement design, materials, modeling, performance, and environmental aspects are encouraged.

History
The ASCE Journal of Transportation Engineering was split into two parts in 2017. Journal of Transportation Engineering, Part A: Systems covers road, bridge, and transit management; while Part B is devoted to all things pavement related.

Indexes
The journal is indexed in Ei Compendex, ProQuest, Civil engineering database, INSPEC, Scopus, and EBSCOHost.

References

External links

Transportation journals
American Society of Civil Engineers academic journals
Publications with year of establishment missing